The 1973 Palestine Cup was the 2nd edition of the Palestine Cup of Nations, it was held in Libya between 11 and 26 August. Ten nations took part in the competition of which Tunisia won.

Participated teams
The 10 participated teams are:

Squads

Group stage

Group A

Group B

Knockout stage

Semifinals

Third place match

Final

Winners

References

External links
RSSSF archives
Elo Ratings

 

1973 in African football
1973 in Asian football
1973–74 in Algerian football
1973–74 in Libyan football
1973
1973